Gordon Johnson, FRAS (born 1943) is a British historian of colonial India.

Biography
Born on 13 September 1943, Johnson was educated at Richmond School in North Yorkshire and Trinity College, Cambridge. He was a fellow at Trinity from 1966 to 1974, and at Selwyn College from 1974 to 1993. He was appointed as a lecturer in Oriental studies at the University of Cambridge in 1974, remaining in that position until 2005.

He was the President of Wolfson College, Cambridge, from 1993 to 2010, and is now an honorary fellow of the college. He was the Director of the Cambridge University Centre of South Asian Studies from 1983 to 2001, and had been a Deputy Vice-Chancellor of the university from 2002 to 2010. He served as the first Provost of the Gates Cambridge Scholarship Trust from 2000 to 2010, and as chair of the Syndicate governing Cambridge University Press from 1981 to 2010. He was the President of the Royal Asiatic Society of Great Britain and Ireland, 2015 to 2018.

He is the General Editor of the New Cambridge History of India, published in 1979.

Select publications 

  A commentary on Cornford's 1908 book Microcosmographia Academica.

References

External links
Brief biography on Wolfson College website

1943 births
20th-century British historians
21st-century British historians
Alumni of Trinity College, Cambridge
Historians of South Asia
Honorary Fellows of Selwyn College, Cambridge
Institute directors
Living people
Presidents of the Royal Asiatic Society
Presidents of Wolfson College, Cambridge